The 1994 FEI World Equestrian Games were held in The Hague, Netherlands from July 27 to August 7, 1994. They were the second edition of the games which are held every four years and run by the FEI.

Events
13 events in 6 disciplines were held in The Hague.

Medal summary

Medalists

Medal count

External links
 FEI Summary

FEI World Equestrian Games
FEI World Equestrian Games
International sports competitions hosted by the Netherlands
Sports competitions in The Hague
Equestrian sports competitions in the Netherlands
FEI World Equestrian Games
20th century in The Hague
FEI World Equestrian Games
FEI World Equestrian Games
Horse driving competition